In the field of wireless communication, macrodiversity is a kind of space diversity scheme using several receiver or transmitter antennas for transferring the same signal. The distance between the transmitters is much longer than the wavelength, as opposed to microdiversity where the distance is in the order of or shorter than the wavelength.

In a cellular network or a wireless LAN, macro-diversity implies that the antennas are typically situated in different base station sites or access points. Receiver macro-diversity is a form of antenna combining, and requires an infrastructure that mediates the signals from the local antennas or receivers to a central receiver or decoder. Transmitter macro-diversity may be a form of simulcasting, where the same signal is sent from several nodes. If the signals are sent over the same physical channel (e.g. the channel frequency and the spreading sequence), the transmitters are said to form a single-frequency network—a term used especially in the broadcasting world.

The aim is to combat fading and to increase the received signal strength and signal quality in exposed positions in between the base stations or access points. Macro diversity may also facilitate efficient multicast services, where the same frequency channel can be used for all transmitters sending the same information. The diversity scheme may be based on transmitter (downlink) macro-diversity and/or receiver (uplink) macro-diversity.

Examples
 CDMA soft handoff:
 UMTS softer handoff.
 OFDM and frequency-domain equalization (FDE) based single-frequency networks (SFN) are a form of transmitter macrodiversity used in broadcasting networks such as DVB-T and DAB
 Dynamic single-frequency networks (DSFN), where a scheduling scheme adapts the SFN formations dynamically to traffic conditions and/or receiver conditions
 802.16e macro diversity handover (MDHO)
 3GPP long-term evolution (LTE) multicast-broadcast single-frequency network (MBSFN), making it possible to efficiently send the same data to many mobiles in adjacent cells.
 Cooperative diversity, for example 3GPP long term evolution (LTE) coordinated multipoint transmission/reception (CoMP), making it possible to increase the data rate to a mobile situated in the overlap of several base station transmission ranges.

Forms
The baseline form of macrodiversity is called single-user macrodiversity. In this form, single user which may have multiple antennas, communicates with several base stations. Therefore, depending on the spatial degree of freedom (DoF) of the system, user may transmit or receive multiple independent data streams to/from base stations in the same time and frequency resource.
 Single-user macrodiversity
 Uplink macrodiversity
 Downlink macrodiversity

In next more advanced form of macrodiversity, multiple distributed users communicate with multiple distributed base stations in the same time and frequency resource. This form of configuration has been shown to utilize available spatial DoF optimally and thus increasing the cellular system capacity and user capacity considerably.
 Multi-user macrodiversity
 Macrodiversity multiple access channel (MAC)
 Macrodiversity broadcast channel (BC)

Mathematical description

The macrodiversity multi-user MIMO uplink communication system considered here
consists of  distributed single antenna
users and  distributed single antenna
base stations (BS). Following the well established narrow band flat
fading MIMO system model, input-output relationship can be given as

where  and
 are the receive and transmit
 are the macrodiversity channel
matrix and the spatially uncorrelated AWGN noise vector,
respectively. The power spectral density of AWGN noise is assumed to
be .
represents the fading coefficient (see Fading) of the th constituent link
which in this particular case, is the link between
th user and the th base station. In macrodiversity scenario,

,

where  is called the average link
The macrodiversity power profile matrix
can thus be defined as

The original input-output relationship may be rewritten in terms of the macrodiversity power profile and so-called normalized channel matrix, as
.
where  is the element-wise
multiplication (see Hadamard product).

.

It has been shown that there exists a functional link between the permanent of macrodiversity power profile matrix,  and the performance of multi-user macrodiversity systems in fading. Although it appears as if the macrodiversity only manifests itself in the power profile, systems that rely on macrodiversity will typically have other types of transmit power constraints (e.g., each element of  has a limited average power) and different sets of coordinating transmitters/receivers when communicating with different users. Note that the input-output relationship above can be easily extended to the case when each transmitter and/or receiver have multiple antennas.

See also
 MIMO
 Multi-user MIMO
 Antenna diversity
 Diversity schemes
 Diversity combining
 Maximum ratio combining
 Selective combining
 Diversity gain
 Microdiversity
 Many Antennas
 Multistatic radar
 Distributed antenna system

References

Antennas
Radio resource management